Dikkaya is a village in the Çamlıhemşin District, Rize Province, in the Black Sea Region of Turkey. Its population is 1,004 (2021).

History 
According to list of villages in Laz language book (2009), name of the village is Mek'alesk'iriti, which means "seize a place". Most villagers are ethnically Laz.

Geography

References

Villages in Çamlıhemşin District
Laz settlements in Turkey